The IABSA Aerobatic 65-02 was a Brazilian single-engine, multirole aircraft and touring braced high-wing designed and built by Indústria Aeronáutica Brasileira (IABSA),  powered by a  piston engine. Although well rated, it never went into production.

Specifications

References

Notes

Bibliography

1960s Brazilian aircraft
1960s Brazilian civil utility aircraft
Aircraft first flown in 1965
Aerobatic 65-02